CUSB Bank is a family owned financial institution based in Cresco, Iowa.  Formerly known as Cresco Union Savings Bank or C US Bank, it was founded in 1888 and provides residential, commercial and agricultural loans.  The bank has locations in Cresco, Lime Springs, Ridgeway, Osage and Charles City.

References

External links
CUSB Bank web site

Banks based in Iowa
Howard County, Iowa
Banks established in 1888